Thembinkosi 'Themba' Mabaso, State Herald, or National Herald, of South Africa, is director of that country's Bureau of Heraldry.

Together with the Heraldry Council, his office forms part of the National Archives of South Africa, under the Ministry of Arts & Culture.

Career
Before becoming a herald, Mabaso's professional experience was in art galleries and fine art preservation.  In 1999 and 2000, he was associated with Johannesburg Art Gallery in Johannesburg and was a chairman of the Conseil International des Musées (International Council of Museums).

In 2002 Mabaso succeeded Frederick Brownell as State Herald of South Africa. His responsibilities including registering coats of arms, insignia badges, flags and seals.  He also advises the South African government, corporations and individuals on matters of heraldry, uniforms and vexillology.

For example, when consulted on how the flag of South Africa should be displayed, Mabaso explained:

Mabaso participates in important state occasions such as the inauguration of a new president of South Africa and represents South Africa at heraldic events worldwide, such as the XXVIIth International Congress of Genealogical and Heraldic Sciences in St Andrews, Scotland, in 2006. On this occasion, both Mabaso and his deputy Marcel van Rossum, wore tabards displaying a design based on the new coat of arms of South Africa adopted in 2000 and based on Khoisan art.

References

External links
South Africa Bureau of Heraldry
The National Arms of South Africa

 
 
 

South African heraldists
Officers of arms
Year of birth missing (living people)
Living people
South African heraldry